Lord Ashcroft International Business School (LAIBS) was the business school of Anglia Ruskin University (ARU) in Cambridge and Chelmsford, England, United Kingdom. LAIBS was renamed to Faculty of Business and Law. 

The Faculty of Business and Law has two schools, which are School of Economics, Finance and Law, and School of Management. Currently, ARU has business schools in Cambridge, Chelmsford, Peterborough, and London. 

The Lord Ashcroft Buildings are located at ARU Cambridge and ARU Chelmsford. Lord Michael Ashcroft, then Chancellor (2001-2021) and alumni of Anglia Ruskin University, donated ten million pounds to construct both business school buildings. HRH Prince Edward, Duke of Edinburgh inaugurated the Chelmsford building in 2003. Lord Ashcroft Building in Cambridge was opened in 2011. The facade of the business school in Cambridge carries the former name of the business school. 

Originally the Chelmsford building was called Michael A. Ashcroft Building and the business school was Michael Ashcroft International Business School. In 2000, Ashcroft was created a Baron, a life peer at the House of Lords. Later, the business school was renamed to Lord Ashcroft International Business School.  

Anglia Ruskin University has one of the largest business schools in the East of England, with nearly 100 full-time teaching staff and approximately 7,200 students from over 100 countries. Faculty of Business and Law of the Anglia Ruskin University is a global business school that provides business programmes through partner institutions worldwide as well.

ARU is a member of the EFMD and offers degrees. The Faculty of Business and Law has a strong global reputation and recognition. Several programmes are accredited by ACCA and CIMA, and many other professional bodies in the United Kingdom. All the department’s courses are accredited by the Chartered Management Institute.

Pro-Vice Chancellor, Professor Mohammad M. Ali is the Dean of the Faculty of Business and Law.

Awards 
In 2014, Anglia Ruskin University were announced as the winner of the Entrepreneurial University of the Year at the Times Higher Education Award. 

In 2016, the university won the Duke of York Award for University Entrepreneurship at Lloyds Bank National Business Awards.

In 2022, Anglia Ruskin’s Faculty of Business and Law received Small Business Charter Award.

Controversies
In March 2018, Lord Ashcroft graduate, Hongkonger Pok Wong started a lawsuit against ARU for misrepresenting the career prospects of the degree she took.

Alumni
 Michael Ashcroft, Baron Ashcroft, English investor, billionaire and former Conservative vice chairman
 Patricia Scotland, Baroness Scotland of Asthal, secretary-general of the Commonwealth of Nations, Labour politician, government policy-maker, former minister, attorney general and president of Chatham House
 Kim Howells, Labour politician and former Chair of the Intelligence and Security Committee
 Nicky Richards, CEO and Chief Investment Officer MLC Asset Management
 Andrew Sayer, English economist, professor of Social Theory and Political Economy at Lancaster University
 Ronald Searle, creator of St Trinian’s
 Mark Wood, businessman, accountant and chairman of NSPCC
 Chris Beckett, academic, author and science-fiction novelist
 John Burnside, academic and T. S. Eliot winner author
 Geraldine Finlayson, researcher and director of John Mackintosh Hall
 Angela Hartnett, entrepreneur and chef
 Anders Holch Povlsen, owner and CEO of Bestseller
 Tim Stokely, founder of OnlyFans

Honorary Doctors 
 Alan Barrell

 Anders Holch Povlsen
 Andrew Marsden
 Andrew Sentance
 Andy Wood
 Anya Hindmarch
 Bob Weston
 Brian Tattersfield
 Christopher Collins
 Dido Harding
 Hermann Hauser
 Joe Greenwell

External links
 http://www.anglia.co.uk/
 http://www.bgf.hu
 https://web.archive.org/web/20110728164933/http://www.space-eu.info/
 http://www.accaglobal.com
 http://www.cimaglobal.com
 http://www.guardian.co.uk/education/table/2012/may/22/university-guide-economics

References

Business schools in England
Anglia Ruskin University